Phạm Phi Nhung (10 April 1970 – 28 September 2021) was a Vietnamese-American singer, actress and humanitarian.  She specialised in Dan Ca and Tru Tinh music. She sang for Paris By Night and Van Son and also acted in their plays and Tinh production. She also recorded music for Lang Van. She performed several duets with singer Mạnh Quỳnh during her career.  She spent most of her time in Vietnam helping the poor and orphans.

Early life 
Phạm Phi Nhung was born on 10 April 1970  in Pleiku, Vietnam to a Vietnamese mother and an American serviceman father. Due to her poor economic upbringing, Phi Nhung only received an education up to the 6th grade. As a child, Phi Nhung was unaware that her father was an American soldier who was stationed in Pleiku during the Vietnam War.

From a young age, Phi Nhung listened to Vietnamese folk music which later influenced her own music.

In 1982, Phi Nhung's mother died. Now orphaned, Phạm went to live with her grandparents. She became a financial caregiver to her five siblings.

Career 
In October 1989, Phi Nhung emigrated to the United States as part of its immigration policy towards Amerasian war offspring. She moved to Tampa, Florida where she met Trizzie Phuong Trinh, a Vietnamese-American singer at a charity concert for a temple. Recognizing her talent, Trizzie advised Phi Nhung to go to California to pursue her dreams. Because she came late to this country, she was very hesitant. In 1993, she moved to Orange County, California.

Her first appearance on stage proved to not be spectacular, causing her to want to abandon her dreams of becoming a singer. Fortunately, thanks to the encouragement of female singer Huong Lan, Phi Nhung has decided to pursue her career as far as possible. Phi Nhung began to gain popularity after her duet  "Que River 1" with famous singer Thai Châu in Hollywood Night 15, after which she made a debut CD with voices of two great singers and American Huyen Vu Tuan. In a recent interview Phi Nhung had confided that to make it big in the music industry, she risked a lot of sweat and tears to pursue the profession, as well as having to self-selling CD's, and singing at music bars.

Phi Nhung returned to Vietnam in 2005 to perform, where her popularity began to rise.  Besides singing, she has had film roles, acted as drama artist, comedian and emcee.  When in the United States, she performed with CarbonWorks, a musical group founded by Neal Barnard, who also founded Physicians Committee for Responsible Medicine.

In 2014, Phi Nhung accepted an invitation to become judge of a reality TV show searching for musical talent and lyrical Solo Bolero 2014. With the comment centered, detailed and reasonable music reviews, Phi Nhung was loved and admired by both contestants and the audience.
In 2015, Phi Nhung accepted the invitation to become guest judge of the Southern Star program (Jury Final Exam 5 night). Subsequently she also appeared in the role of judge of the Bolero 2 Solo 2015 season.

In early 2016, alongside Hoai Linh, Phi Nhung participated as a judge for the Southern Stars 2016 gameshow.

In early 2021, she participated in the game show of Ky Uc Vui Ve.

Personal life and death
Phi Nhung was Buddhist. She was a noted philanthropist, returning to Vietnam to participate in orphanage projects, starting a fund that cared for orphans at the Phap Lac Pagoda in Binh Phuoc Province. She adopted 19 children.

On 26 August 2021, Phi Nhung was hospitalized at Cho Ray Hospital in Ho Chi Minh City after contracting COVID-19. Her health deteriorated a month later, and she died on 28 September 2021, at the age of 51. Her remains were cremated and sent back to the United States days prior to her funeral. Her funeral was held on 12 October 2021, with members of Paris by Night attending. She was interred in Chùa Huệ Quang in Santa Ana, California later that day.

Discography

Studio albums

Collaborative albums

With Mạnh Quỳnh

With other artists

As part of Thúy Nga

Filmography

References

External links
Phi Nhung's official site
Phi Nhung's biography from Vietscape

 
 

1970 births
2021 deaths
Deaths from the COVID-19 pandemic in Vietnam
American Buddhists
Vietnamese Buddhists
Vietnamese-language singers
Vietnamese emigrants to the United States
Vietnamese people of American descent
People from Gia Lai Province
Thuy Nga Productions
20th-century American singers
20th-century American women singers
21st-century American singers
21st-century American women singers